

Name 
Pathy is a Hindic surname that may refer to
Dinanath Pathy, Indian painter, author and art historian 
Mark Pathy, Canadian entrepreneur, and astronaut
Rajshree Pathy, Indian entrepreneur

"Pathy" are mostly Brahmins.

Morpheme 
-pathy is a Greek suffix/infix/affix from "pathos" (suffering)

See also
Pathi